Probarbital (trade names Ipral, Vasalgin) is a barbiturate derivative invented in the 1920s. It has sedative, hypnotic and anticonvulsant properties.

References 

Anticonvulsants
Barbiturates
GABAA receptor positive allosteric modulators
Sedatives